The Grob G 103 Twin Astir is a glass-reinforced plastic two-seat sailplane that was developed in Germany in the 1970s by Grob Aircraft AG as a counterpart to the single-seat G 102 Astir then in production. Construction throughout is similar, although to preserve the centre of gravity of the design, the wings were given a slight forward sweep. While many two-seat derivatives of single-seat sailplanes have fixed undercarriage, due to the added space restrictions created by the second seat, Grob devised a novel retraction system for the Twin Astir. The single wheel was designed to rotate 90° sideways before retracting "flat" under the rear seat, resulting in a rather unusual seating position. This was only incorporated in early examples, later on, the wheel was fixed. Factory options offered to customers included whether the front seat should be equipped with flight instruments, and whether water ballast capacity should be installed.

Production continued until around 1980, when it was replaced in production by the Twin II, a new and not directly related design originally designated G 118 but later redesignated the G 103a. The G 103a was in turn replaced by the Twin III in production in 1989.

The Twin was one of the first two-seat sailplanes built from fibreglass and has higher glide performance than most similar sailplanes of the time (e.g. Schleicher ASK 21, Scheibe SF 34 and SZD-50 Puchacz).

Operators

 Italian Air Force  operated 9 Grob G103 Twin Astir from 1975 until 1999

 Australian Air Force Cadets currently operates 2 Twin Astirs as of 2020

Specifications

See also

References

External links

Homepage of Grob Aircraft AG

1970s German sailplanes
Grob aircraft
Aircraft first flown in 1976
T-tail aircraft